Megalostrata was a female Spartan poet known only from a fragment of the lyric poet Alcman, which is cited in Athenaeus' Deipnosophistae.  Alcman describes her as a "golden-haired maiden enjoying the gift of the Muses".  None of her works survive.  According to Athenaeus, Megalostrata was the lover of Alcman, who loved her because of her conversational skills.  However, the love between Megalostrata and Alcman was probably an invention of Archytas or Chamaeleon, Athenaeus' sources for his anecdote about Megalostrata.

See also
 Cleitagora

Citations

Ancient Greek lyric poets
Ancient Spartan poets
Ancient Spartan women
Ancient Greek women poets
7th-century BC poets
7th-century BC Greek women